Jill Hetherington won in the final 6–2, 6–1 against Katrina Adams.

Seeds
A champion seed is indicated in bold text while text in italics indicates the round in which that seed was eliminated. The top eight seeds received a bye to the second round.

  Patty Fendick (semifinals)
  Anne Minter (semifinals)
  Terry Phelps (quarterfinals)
  Gretchen Magers (quarterfinals)
  Beverly Bowes (third round)
  Elizabeth Minter (third round)
  Sara Gomer (second round)
  Belinda Cordwell (quarterfinals)
  Pam Casale (second round)
  Angeliki Kanellopoulou (first round)
  Louise Field (second round)
  Marie-Christine Calleja (second round)
  Jill Hetherington (champion)
  Annabel Croft (third round)
 n/a
 n/a

Draw

Finals

Top half

Section 1

Section 2

Bottom half

Section 3

Section 4

References
 1988 Fernleaf Classic Draw (Archived 2009-09-28)

Singles
Singles
1988 in New Zealand sport